Monognathus, or onejaw, is the only genus of the family Monognathidae of deep-sea eels. The name comes from the Greek monos meaning “one” and gnathos meaning “jaw”, a reference to the large mouth in comparison with the rest of the fish, and also the absence of an upper jaw (maxilla and premaxilla bones are absent).

Description 
The dorsal and anal fins lack bony supports and the pectoral fins are missing. The snout has a fang connected to glands, which are venomous in adults. These eels are virtually blind, with rudimentary eyes and small olfactory organs, although the male olfactory organs are enlarged, perhaps suggesting a method of "sniffing out" a mate.

Typical lengths are from 4 to 10 cm (1.5–4 in), the maximum length recorded is 15.9 cm (6.3 in).

Distribution 
They are found at depths of over 2,000 m (6,600 ft), and are found in all oceans.

Species 
The fifteen known species are:
 Monognathus ahlstromi Raju, 1974 (Paddletail onejaw)
 Monognathus berteli J. G. Nielsen & Hartel, 1996.
 Monognathus bertini Bertelsen & J. G. Nielsen, 1987.
 Monognathus boehlkei Bertelsen & J. G. Nielsen, 1987.
 Monognathus bruuni Bertin, 1936.
 Monognathus herringi Bertelsen & J. G. Nielsen, 1987.
 Monognathus isaacsi Raju, 1974.
 Monognathus jesperseni Bertin, 1936.
 Monognathus jesse Raju, 1974.
 Monognathus nigeli Bertelsen & J. G. Nielsen, 1987.
 Monognathus ozawai Bertelsen & J. G. Nielsen, 1987.
 Monognathus rajui Bertelsen & J. G. Nielsen, 1987.
 Monognathus rosenblatti Bertelsen & J. G. Nielsen, 1987.
 Monognathus smithi Bertelsen & J. G. Nielsen, 1987.
 Monognathus taningi Bertin, 1936.

References

Monognathidae
Deep sea fish
Marine fish genera
Taxa named by Léon Bertin